"The One with the Cop" is the sixteenth episode of the fifth season of Friends  and the 113th overall. It first aired on the NBC network in the United States on February 25, 1999.

Plot
In the teaser, Chandler and Monica cuddle while cooperating on a crossword puzzle, which Joey finds cute. That night, however, he dreams that he was doing the crossword puzzle with Monica, leading him to wonder if he finds her attractive. This is exacerbated when, at Central Perk the next morning, Monica is found wearing his sweatshirt as opposed to Chandler's, and later when Monica asks him to taste her cooking, leading to him confessing about his dreams. A bit of honest discussion between the three of them reveals that Joey is not really attracted to Monica, but rather to the intimacy and friendship she shares with Chandler. The two explain that this is because they were friends first before they started dating. Equipped with this new philosophy, he first tries to get on Rachel's good side, on the grounds that they are already friends, but she advises him to strike up a friendship with a woman and then pursue a relationship. Joey tries to do this, but when meeting a woman to strike up a friendship, he ends up in a threesome with her and her roommate.

While digging beneath a Central Perk chair cushion for spare change, Phoebe uncovers a policeman's badge. Though she promises to return it, she finds using it far more entertaining, exploiting her new-found power to force a smoking bystander to apologize to a tree on which she snubbed out a cigarette. When she begins threatening her friends with arrest, she realizes she has gone too far, but before she can return it, she tries to force an illegally-parked man to move his car. He turns out to be a policeman as well, and is unimpressed when she claims to be an undercover cop from the 15th district of Manhattan. This fellow, Gary, turns out to be the owner of the badge, but when he arrives at Monica's apartment to arrest her, he asks her out on a date instead.

Rachel is helping Ross shop for a new couch. After he finds one he likes, he forgoes delivery charges by having her help him carry it the three blocks to his apartment (he also fends off a condescending salesman by proclaiming that he and Rachel have had sex 298 times, leaving Rachel incredulous as to how he kept count). Getting it up a narrow stairwell proves more problematic, and after Rachel gets help from  Chandler, the three attempt to manhandle the couch up the stairs, only to get it stuck between landings. The couch ends up cut in half after Rachel accidentally pulls the fire alarm and Ross’ neighbors have to walk over the couch. Ross then attempts to return it and receives store credit in the amount of four dollars.

Pivot scene
A scene in the episode where Ross, while moving his new sofa up the stairs, repeatedly screams "pivot" at Rachel and Chandler was called iconic by the magazine House Beautiful. It became a meme on the internet.

The Irish website Joe wrote that the mathematician Caroline Zunckel explained how the friends got the sofa upstairs, saying: "By applying Pythagoras' theorem to the estimated measurements of Ross's sofa in a vertical position and dimensions of the stairs, I was able to establish that it would have been possible to get the item upstairs. It's quite simple really!".

HuffPost wrote that it was one of the "14 Best Episodes of Friends to Binge Watch Right Now".

References

1999 American television episodes
Friends (season 5) episodes